At least two warships of Japan have been named Isoshio:

, an  launched in 1972 and expended as a target in 1994
, an  launched in 2000

Japanese Navy ship names
Japan Maritime Self-Defense Force ship names